Enets is a Samoyedic language of Northern Siberia spoken on the Lower Yenisei within the boundaries of the Taimyr Municipality District, a subdivision of Krasnoyarsk Krai, Russia Federation.  Enets belongs to the Northern branch of the Samoyedic languages, in turn a branch of the Uralic language family. In 2010 about 40 people claimed to be native Enets speakers, while In 2020, 69 people claimed to speak Enets natively, while 97 people answered to know Enets in total.

Dialects 
There are two distinct dialects, Forest Enets (Bai) and Tundra Enets (Madu or Somatu), which may be considered separate languages.

Forest Enets is the smaller of the two Enets dialects. In the winter of 2006/2007, approximately 35 people spoke it (6 in Dudinka, 20 in Potapova and 10 in Tukhard, the youngest of whom was born in 1962 and the oldest in 1945). Many of these speakers are trilingual, with competence in Forest Enets, Tundra Nenets and Russian, preferring to speak Tundra Nenets.

The two dialects differ both in phonology and in lexicon. Additional variation was found in early Enets records from the 17th to 19th centuries, though all these varieties can be assigned as either Tundra Enets or Forest Enets.

Phonological differences:
 In some words, Forest Enets  corresponds to Tundra Enets  (from Proto-Samoyedic *ms, *ns, *rs and *rkʲ).
 Forest  — Tundra  'wind' (from *merse < *märkʲä);
 Forest  — Tundra  'meat' (from *ʊnsa < *əmså);
 Forest  — Tundra  'snow';
 Forest  — Tundra  'pike';
 Forest  — Tundra  'grandmother';
 In some words, Forest Enets word-initial  corresponds to Tundra Enets  (from Proto-Samoyedic *a- > *ä-).
 Certain vowel + glide sequences of Proto-Samoyedic have different reflexes in Forest Enets and Tundra Enets.
 Forest Enets word-initial  corresponds to Tundra Enets .

Lexical differences:
 Forest  — Tundra  'head'
 Forest  — Tundra  'word'
 Forest  — Tundra  'tobacco'
 Forest  — Tundra  'what'

Orthography 
Enets is written using the Cyrillic alphabet, though it includes the letters ԑ, ӈ, and ҫ which are not used in the Russian alphabet.

The written form of the Enets language was created during the 1980s and has been used to produce a number of books. During the 1990s there was a local newspaper with insert in local languages (including Enets language), Советский Таймыр (Soviet Taimyr, modern simple Taymyr) published and brief Enets broadcasts on local radio, which shut down in 2003, served as supplements for speakers.

In 2019, the Enets alphabet was reformed, and in April 2020, the Enets primer was published in a new version of the alphabet. The alphabet contains the following letters:

Phonology

Phoneme Inventory 
The following phonemes are combined from all of the different dialects of the Enets languages;

Vowels

Consonants 

 There is partial or complete vowel reduction in the middle and at the end of a word
 Consonants preceding i and e become palatalized

Uralist transcription

Vowels 

Vowel length is indicated by a macron, e.g. ē .

Consonants

Stress 
The type of stress in Enets is quantitative. Stressed vowels are pronounced relatively longer than unstressed vowels. Based on the available data, the stress is not (as a rule) used as a feature for distinguishing the meaning. The stress in a word usually falls on the first vowel. The primary stress usually falls on the first syllable and is accompanied by a secondary stress, which falls on the third and the fifth syllable. Sometimes the stress distinguishes the meaning, e.g. in mo·di ('I') vs. modi· ('shoulder'). (The primary stress is marked by ·).

Morphology 

The parts of speech in Enets are: nouns, adjectives, numerals, pronouns, verbs, adverbs, postpositions, conjunctions, interjections and connective particles.

The grammatical number is expressed by means of the opposition of the singular, dual and plural forms. There are three declensions, the main (non-possessive), possessive and desiderative declensions, and seven cases in Enets: the nominative, genitive, accusative, lative, locative, ablative and prolative case. The meaning of those cases is expressed by means of suffixes added to nouns, adjectives, pronouns and substantivized verbs. In their fixed forms they also belong to adverbs and postpositions. The possession is expressed by means of the genitive case or possessive suffixes.

Local orientation is based on the three-member distribution: the suffixes of local cases of nouns, adverbs and postpositions are divided among the lative (to where?), locative (where?) and ablative (from where?). The prolative case (along what? or through what?) expresses an additional fourth local characteristic.

The verbal negation is expressed by the combination of the main verb with a preceding auxiliary negative verb. The auxiliary verb is conjugated according to general rules, but the main verb is in a special inconjugated negative form. There are also some verbs of absence - non-possessiveness. Six moods are contrasted in the Enets language: indicative, conjunctive, imperative, optative, quotative and interrogative.  There are three tenses: aorist, preterite and future. 

The category of person with nouns is expressed by means of possessive suffixes, differing in all three numbers of all three persons and used in nouns, pronouns, substantivized verbs, adverbs and postpositions. The category of person with verbs is expressed by means of particular personal suffixes of the verb, differing in all three numbers of all three persons.

There are three conjugations in Enets: subjective, objective and reflexive. These conjugations differ from each other by personal suffixes. Additionally, the objective conjugation uses numerical suffixes, referring to all three numbers of the object. In the case of the reflexive conjugation, the person of the subject and object is the same and a separate suffix indicates reflexivity.

Nouns 

Depending on the final sounds of the word stem, nouns can be divided into two groups: 
 nouns with a final sound other than a laryngal plosive stop, e.g. d'uda 'horse'
 nouns with a final laryngal plosive stop, e.g. tauʔ 'Nganasan'
Either group uses variants of suffixes with a different initial sound (e.g. Loc d'uda-han, tau-kon).

There are seven cases in Enets: the nominative, genitive, accusative, lative, locative, ablative and prolative case. The case suffixes are combined with numeral markers, often in a fairly complex manner.

The dual case forms are produced on the basis of an uninflected dual form with the suffix -hi̮ʔ/-gi̮ʔ/-ki̮ʔ by adding the respective singular case endings of some postpositions (mainly nə-) in local cases.

Adjectives 

There are a number of adjectives that have no specific suffixes, e.g. utik 'bad', sojδa 'good', lodo 'low' and piδe 'high'.

Alongside of these there are various suffixal adjectives, e.g. buse̮-saj ne̮ 'a married woman', bite-δa 'waterless', uδa-šiδa 'handless', mȯga-he 'belonging to the forest', same-raha 'wolf-like', narδe-de̮ 'red', polδe-de̮ 'black'.

An adjective does not agree with the following main word either in number or case, e.g. agga koja 'big sterlet', agga koja-hone (locative), agga koja-hi̮t (plural ablative). As an exception , we can refer to the use of the adjective instead of an elliptical noun and as a predicate in the nominal conjugation.

With the aim of strengthening a possessive connection, sometimes a respective possessive suffix may be added to the main word of an attribute, e.g. keδerʔ koba-δa ŋul'ʔ mujuʔ 'the wild reindeer skin is very strong' ("its-skin of-the-wild-reindeer...").

The comparative degree is formed by means of an adjective in the positive degree (in the nominative form) with the word to be compared in the ablative form.

Numerals

Cardinals 

1. ŋōʔ

2. siδe

3. nehuʔ

4. teto

5. sobboreggo

6. mottuʔ

7. seʔo

8. sidiʔeto

9. nēsā

10. biwʔ

11. ŋoʔbodade

12. side bodade

13. nehuʔ bodade

14. teto bodade

20. sidiuʔ

21. sidiuʔ ŋōʔ

30. nehibiʔ

40. tetujʔ

50. sobboreggujʔ

60. motujʔ

70. seʔujʔ

80. siδetujʔ

90. nēsauʔ

100. juʔ

Ordinals 

1. orδede̮

2. ne̮kujde̮

3. ne̮hode̮

4. tetode̮

5. sobode̮

6. motode̮

7. se̮ʔode̮

8. siδetode̮

9. ne̮satode̮

10. biwde̮

100. d'urde̮

Other numerals 

Collective numerals are formed combining a separate word namely a form e̮š of the auxiliary verb 'to be' with cardinal numerals, e.g. siδe e̮š 'we two, the two of us'.

Distributive numerals are postpositional constructions of cardinals, combined with the postposition loδ, e.g. siδeʔ loδ 'by (in) twos'.

Iteratives are the plural forms of cardinals, e.g. ŋobuʔ 'one time, once'.

Fractional numerals are cardinals that are combined with the word boʔ 'a half', e.g. nehuʔ boʔ 'one-third'.

Temporal numerals are formed from cardinals by means of the suffix -ʔ, e.g. orδede̮ʔ 'the first time'.

Pronouns

Personal Pronouns 

Two-member constructions are used are used in declining personal pronouns. The second member of these constructions is either an independent word stem si- or a postpositional stem no-. The first member may be lacking.

{| class="wikitable"
|-
! style="text-align:center" | Case !! Singular !! Dual !! Plural
|-
| style="text-align:center" | Nominative || modi, mod''' 'I' || modiniʔ 'we two' || modinaʔ 'we'
|-
| style="text-align:center" | Genitive || mod' siń || modińʔ siδińʔ || modinaʔ siδnaʔ|-
| style="text-align:center" | Accusative || mod' siʔ || modińʔ siδińʔ || modinaʔ siδnaʔ|-
| style="text-align:center" | Lative || mod' noń || modińʔ nońʔ || modinaʔ nonaʔ|-
| style="text-align:center" | Locative || mod' none̮ń || modińʔ none̮ńʔ || modinaʔ nonnaʔ|-
| style="text-align:center" | Ablative || mod' noδoń || modińʔ noδońʔ || modinaʔ noδnaʔ|-
| style="text-align:center" | Prolative || mod' noone̮ń || modińʔ noone̮ńʔ || modinaʔ noone̮naʔ|}

{| class="wikitable"
|-
! style="text-align:center" | Case !! Singular !! Dual !! Plural
|-
| style="text-align:center" | Nominative || ū 'you' || ūdiʔ 'you two' || ūdaʔ 'you'
|-
| style="text-align:center" | Genitive || ū sit || ūdiʔ siδtiʔ || ūdaʔ siδtaʔ|-
| style="text-align:center" | Accusative || ū sit || ūdiʔ siδδiʔ || ūdaʔ siδδaʔ|-
| style="text-align:center" | Lative || ū nod || ūdiʔ nodiʔ || ūdaʔ nodaʔ|-
| style="text-align:center" | Locative || ū none̮d || ūdiʔ nondiʔ || ūdaʔ nondaʔ|-
| style="text-align:center" | Ablative || ū noδod || ūdiʔ noδdiʔ || ūdaʔ noδdaʔ|-
| style="text-align:center" | Prolative || ū noone̮d || ūdiʔ noone̮diʔ || ūdaʔ noone̮daʔ|}

{| class="wikitable"
|-
! style="text-align:center" | Case !! Singular !! Dual !! Plural
|-
| style="text-align:center" | Nominative || bu 'he/she' || budiʔ 'they two' || buduʔ 'they'
|-
| style="text-align:center" | Genitive || bu sita || budiʔ sitiʔ || buduʔ siδtuʔ|-
| style="text-align:center" | Accusative || bu sita || budiʔ siδδiʔ || buduʔ siδδuʔ|-
| style="text-align:center" | Lative || bu noda || budiʔ nodiʔ || buduʔ noduʔ|-
| style="text-align:center" | Locative || bu nonda || budiʔ nondiʔ || buduʔ nonduʔ|-
| style="text-align:center" | Ablative || bu noδda || budiʔ noδdiʔ || buduʔ noδduʔ|-
| style="text-align:center" | Prolative || bu noone̮da || budiʔ noone̮diʔ || buduʔ noone̮duʔ|}

 Other Pronouns 

Reflexive pronouns are pairs of words whose first component consists of personal pronouns, the second is a separate word stem ker-, combined with their respective possessive suffixes, e.g. mod' keriń 'I myself', ū kerit 'you yourself', bu kerta 'she herself/he himself' or modiń keriń 'we two ourselves'.

Interrogative pronouns are kurse̮ 'which?', sēa 'who?' (used only for humans) and obu 'what?' (used for animals and lifeless objects).

Negative pronouns are formed from interrogative pronouns by adding the suffix -hȯru, e.g. obuhȯru.

 Verbs 

The verbs in Enets can be distributed into two groups in principally the same manner as the noun depending on the final sounds of the word stem. Either group uses the variants of suffixes with different initial sounds.

Seven moods are contrasted: indicative, conjunctive, imperative, optative, quotative and interrogative. There are three tenses: aorist, preterite and future. (These tenses exist practically only in the indicative mood.) The verb has three conjugations: subjective, objective and reflexive. These conjugations differ from each other by personal suffixes. In addition to this the objective conjugation uses numerical suffixes, referring to all three numbers of the object. In the case of reflexive conjugation a separate suffix indicates reflexivity.

 Finite forms 

The aorist is either unmarked or with the marker -ŋV-/-V-. The temporal meaning of the aorist depends on the aspect of the verb. A prolonged or recurrent action should be understood as taking place in the present, a short-time or single action as having taken place in the past, whereas the influence of the latter is still felt in the present. A distinctly past action is expressed by the preterite with the marker -ś/-š/-d'/-t'/-č, whereas the marker is placed after personal suffixes. The future action is expressed by the future marker -d-/-dV-/-t-/-tV- before personal suffixes.

The objective conjugation uses one type of personal suffixes when the object is in the singular and another type of them with the object in the dual or the plural. In the case of the dual object the dual marker -hu-/-gu-/-ku- precedes the dual personal suffixes of the second type, whereas in the case of the plural object, the rise of the stem vowel can be observed. The marker of the reflexive mood is -i-, which is standing before personal suffixes.

 Syntax 
The syntax of Enets is typical for the family and the area. The Enets language follows Subject-object-verb, head marking in the noun phrase, both head and dependent marking within the clause, non-finite verbal forms used for clause combining. Consequently, the finite verb form (the predicate) is always at the end of a sentence. The negative auxiliary verb immediately precedes the main verb. The object of a sentence always keeps to the word it belongs to.

 Grammar 
Enets nouns vary for number, case, and person-number of the possessor. There is also an intriguing nominal case in which ‘destinativity’ determines the entity is destined for someone. Possessor markers are also used for discourse related purposes, where they are completely devoid of the literal possessive meaning. Enets postpositions are marked for person-number; many postpositions are formed from a small set of relational nouns and case morphology.

Literature

 
 Haig, G. L., Nau, N., Schnell, S., & Wegener, C. (2011). Achievements and Perspectives. Documenting Endangered Languages, 119-150. doi:10.1515/9783110260021.vii
 Khanina, O. (2018). Documenting a language with phonemic and phonetic variation: the case of Enets. Language Documentation & Conservation 12. 430-460. http://hdl.handle.net/10125/24772
Khanina, O., & Shluinsky, A. (2008). Finites structures in Forest Enets subordination: A case study of language change under strong Russian influence. Subordination and Coordination Strategies in North Asian Languages Current Issues in Linguistic Theory, 63-75. doi:10.1075/cilt.300.07kha
 Khanina, O., & Shluinsky, A. (2013). Choice of case in cross-reference markers: Forest Enets non-finite forms. Finnisch-Ugrische Mitteilungen Band, 37, 32-44. Retrieved from http://iling-ran.ru/Shluinsky/ashl/ChoiceOfCase_2013.pdf
 
 Mikola T.: Morphologisches Wörterbuch des Enzischen. Szeged, 1995 (= Studia Uralo-Altaica 36)
 Siegl, F. (2012). More on Possible Forest Enets – Ket Contacts. Eesti ja Soome-Ugri Keeleteaduse Ajakiri, 3(1), 327-341. doi:10.12697/jeful.2015.6.3.00
 Siegl, F. (2012). Yes/no questions and the interrogative mood in Forest Enets . Per Urales ad Orientem. Iter polyphonicum multilingue, 399-408. Retrieved from http://www.sgr.fi/sust/sust264/sust264_siegl.pdf
 
 Siegl, F. (2015). Negation in Forest Enets. Negation in Uralic Languages Typological Studies in Language, 43-74. doi:10.1075/tsl.108.02sie
 Vajda, E. J. (2008). Subordination and Coordination Strategies in North Asian Languages. Current Issues in Linguistic Theory, 63-73. doi:10.1075/cilt.300  
 Болина, Д. С.: Русско-энецкий разговорник. Санкт-Петербург: Просвещение, 2003, 111p. 
 Сорокина, И. П.; Болина, Д .С.: Энецкий-русско и русско-энецкий словарь. Санкт-Петербург: Просвещение, 2001, 311p. 
 Сорокина, И. П.; Болина, Д .С.: Энецкие тексты. Санкт-Петербург: Наука, 2005, 350 p.. . Online version.
 Сорокина, И. П.; Болина, Д. С.: Энецкий словарь с кратким грамматическим очерком: около 8.000 слов. Санкт-Петербург: Наука 2009, 488p. 
 Сорокина, И. П.: Энецкий язык''. Санкт-Петербург: Наука 2010, 411p.

References

External links

Enets bibliography
Bibliography on Enets studies
Linguistic items (Texts, vocabularies, links, ...)
ELAR archive of Enets language documentation materials
http://www.siberianlanguages.surrey.ac.uk/summary/

Northern Samoyedic languages
Languages of Russia
Krasnoyarsk Krai
Subject–object–verb languages
Endangered Uralic languages